Juan José Rodríguez (11 January 1937 – 2 June 1993) was an Argentine footballer. He played in six matches for the Argentina national football team in 1959. He was also part of Argentina's squad for the 1959 South American Championship that took place in Ecuador.

References

External links
 

1937 births
1993 deaths
Argentine footballers
Argentina international footballers
Place of birth missing
Association football forwards
Boca Juniors footballers
Club Nacional de Football players
Club Atlético Huracán footballers
Racing Club de Avellaneda footballers
Quilmes Atlético Club footballers